Bezannes is a commune of the Marne department in northeastern France, near the city of Reims. The Gare de Champagne-Ardenne TGV is located on the territory of the commune.

Population

See also
Communes of the Marne department

References

Communes of Marne (department)